Badagada (also Bada-Gada) is a semi urban village in the Surada Block of Ganjam district, Odisha, India.

Location
Badagada is located on the banks of the River Jarau, about 16 km from Surada and 68 km from Brahmapur. It is connected by road to Surada and Sheragada by the State Highway 36 (Odisha). It is part of the Surada Assembly constituency and the Aska Parliamentary constituency.

References

Sources
 
 http://www.worksodisha.gov.in/shdp.html

Villages in Ganjam district